The following results are the 2021 European Mixed Team Badminton Championships' qualification stage.

Summary 
The qualification stage will hold between 9–12 December 2020 in 6 cities across Europe.

§: Subgroup's winner.
: Cancelled due to the withdrawal of 3 out of 4 teams.
: Cancelled due to the qualification stage cannot be hosted in France or any of the other countries participating in this group.
: Lithuania withdrew from this qualification stage.

Group composition

Group 1

Sweden vs. Estonia

England vs. Hungary

Sweden vs. Hungary

England vs. Estonia

Estonia vs. Hungary

England vs. Sweden

Group 2

Russia vs. Poland

Switzerland vs. Belgium

Switzerland vs. Poland

Russia vs. Belgium

Russia vs. Switzerland

Belgium vs. Poland

Group 3

Netherlands vs. Slovakia

Czech Republic vs. Austria

Czech Republic vs. Slovakia

Netherlands vs. Austria

Netherlands vs. Czech Republic

Austria vs. Slovakia

Group 6

Latvia vs. Portugal

Spain vs. Ukraine

Scotland vs. Portugal

Ukraine vs. Latvia

Spain vs. Latvia

Scotland vs. Ukraine

Spain vs. Portugal

Scotland vs. Latvia

Ukraine vs. Portugal

Spain vs. Scotland

References 

2021
European Mixed Team Badminton Championships qualification
2021 European Mixed Team Badminton Championships qualification
2021 European Mixed Team Badminton Championships qualification
2021 European Mixed Team Badminton Championships qualification
2021 European Mixed Team Badminton Championships qualification
2021 European Mixed Team Badminton Championships qualification
2021 European Mixed Team Badminton Championships qualification
European Mixed Team Badminton Championships
European Mixed Team Badminton Championships
European Mixed Team Badminton Championships
European Mixed Team Badminton Championships
European Mixed Team Badminton Championships
European Mixed Team Badminton Championships
International sports competitions hosted by England
International sports competitions hosted by Belgium
International sports competitions hosted by Austria
International sports competitions hosted by Germany
International sports competitions hosted by France
International sports competitions hosted by Portugal